The Fédération Internationale de Philatélie (FIP) was founded on 18 June 1926, and is the world federation for philately based in Zürich, Switzerland.

Aims 
The primary aims of the FIP are:

To promote stamp collecting and philately.
To maintain friendly relations and friendship among all peoples.
To establish and maintain close relations with the philatelic trade and postal administrations.
To promote philatelic exhibitions by granting Patronage and Auspices

Since its inception in 1926, when a small number of European federations came together to found a worldwide organisation, the FIP has promoted the hobby that is sometimes called The King of Hobbies and the Hobby of Kings. FIP works to promote philately in developing countries, in Asia and in the industrialised countries, where it appears to be stagnating. It coordinates contact between the philatelic organisations in different countries.

Governance 
The FIP is run by a Board of Directors with a President and three Vice-Presidents. Since 2010, the president has been Bernard Beston, of Australia.

Commissions
There are eleven FIP Commissions which deal with the following subjects:

Aerophilately
Astrophilately
Fight against Forgeries
Maximaphily
Philatelic literature
Postal history
Postal stationery
Thematic philately
Traditional philately
Revenues
Youth philately

Each Commission has its own Commissioner.

Congress
The FIP Congress takes place annually during one of the international exhibitions that it has endorsed.

Exhibitions 
Every year the FIP provides patronage to a number of major stamp exhibitions. In 2008, FIP selected Tel Aviv, Paris, Bucharest, Prague, and Vienna.

In 2004, FIP ran its first "World Stamp Competition" in Singapore and selected Tel Aviv for the second competition in 2008. The competitions involved national teams and philatelic jurors.

See also 
 International Philatelic Union
 La Federación Interamericana de Filatelia

References

External links
 Official website
 WADP Numbering System

Philatelic organizations
Organisations based in Zürich
Organizations established in 1926